Keoni Waxman (born June 30, 1968) is an American film director best known for his work with Steven Seagal since 2009 with the film The Keeper.

Filmography
 I Shot a Man in Vegas (1995)
 Countdown (1996)
 Almost Blue (1996)
 Sweepers (1998)
 The Highwayman (2000)
 Intrepid (2000; written only)
 Hostage Negotiator (2001; TV Movie)
 Lost Treasure (2003; screenplay only)
 Shooting Gallery (2005)
 Amber's Story (2006; TV Movie)
 The Suspect (2006)
 Unthinkable (2007; TV Movie)
 The Anna Nicole Smith Story (2009)
 The Keeper (2009)
 A Dangerous Man (2009)
 Hunt to Kill (2010)
 True Justice (2010–2012; TV Series, 8 episodes)
 Maximum Conviction (2012)
 Force of Execution (2013)
 A Good Man (2014)
 Absolution (2015)
 Contract to Kill (2016)
 End of a Gun (2016)
 Cartels (2017)
 The Hard Way (2019)
 Alpha Code (2020)
 The Ravine (2021)
 Hong Kong Love Story (TBA)

References

External links
 

1968 births
Living people
American film directors